End of Summer is a 1995 romantic drama film directed by Linda Yellen. It stars Jacqueline Bisset and Peter Weller and was first broadcast on Showtime. It received a limited theatrical release in 1997.

Plot
Christine (Bisset) is a wealthy aristocrat in 1890s New York City. She is a spinster that unexpectedly gets another shot at love, although the opportunity is threatened by her false pride and puritanical social views.

Cast
 Jacqueline Bisset as Christine Van Buren
 Peter Weller as Theo Remmington
 Julian Sands as Basil
 Amy Locane as Alice
 Elizabeth Shepherd as Vera
 Michael Hogan as The General
 Karyn Dwyer as Jenny
 Janet-Laine Green as Lucie

References

External links
 

1995 television films
1995 films
Films directed by Linda Yellen
Films set in New York (state)
Films set in the 1890s
Hallmark Channel original films
1995 romantic drama films
American romantic drama films
American drama television films
1990s American films